Villavaler is one of fifteen parishes (administrative divisions) in Pravia, a municipality within the province and autonomous community of Asturias, in northern Spain.

The population is 117 (INE 2011).

Villages and hamlets
 Carceda 
 Lomparte (Llomparti)
 Omedas (Umedas) 
 Palación 
 Perriella 
 San Bartolomé (San Bartuelu) 
 Sangreña 
 Valdidiello (Valdidiellu)

References

Parishes in Pravia